San Jose de Ocune is a town and  municipality located in the Department of Vichada, Colombia.

Municipalities of Vichada Department